Maurice Warwick Beresford,  (6 February 1920 – 15 December 2005) was an English economic historian and archaeologist specialising in the medieval period. He was Professor of Economic History at the University of Leeds.

Early life and education
Beresford was born on 6 February 1920 in Sutton Coldfield, then in Warwickshire. He was the only child of Harry Bertram Beresford and Nora Elizabeth Beresford ( Jefferies). His father died in 1934, aged 46, and Maurice's mother continued to live with him until her death in 1966, aged 79.

From 1930 to 1938, Beresford was educated at Bishop Vesey's Grammar School, a state grammar school in Sutton Coldfield. While there, he was enthused by two teachers, one a history master and the other from geography. He was successful at school, becoming a prefect, school librarian and editor of the school newspaper.

In 1937, Beresford sat a joint entrance exam in history for six of the University of Cambridge's colleges and was awarded an exhibition at his fifth choice, Jesus College. He matriculated in 1938. He studied for the history tripos under Bernard Manning and Charles Wilson, and took a First in part I. After doing so well, he was awarded a minor scholarship for the rest of his degree. He specialised in the medieval period for Part II, and took part in an economic history seminar run by John Saltmarsh. He passed part II and his degree with first class honours. He graduated from Cambridge with a BA in 1941, later promoted to an MA. 

As an undergraduate, Beresford wrote a paper on parkland in Sutton Coldfield, the beginning of his interest in the interaction between the physical landscape and documents such as maps: this interest led to his 1957 publication, History on the Ground.

In September 1939, with the start of the Second World War, Beresford registered as a conscientious objector. He was exempted from military service in April 1940 on the condition that he continued his studies. After completing his degree, he undertook social work in London and Birmingham.

Academic career
Beresford began his academic career not at a university but in adult education. He was Sub-Warden (1942–1943) and then Warden (1943–1948) of Percival Guildhouse, an adult education centre and charity in Rugby, Warwickshire. He continued his research, including studying the local area through RAF aerial photography and old maps to rebuild the medieval landscape. His main interests were in medieval field systems and the history of settlement. In 1945 he identified the deserted medieval village of Bittesby in Leicestershire. He expanded his interests from history and historical geography into archaeology and was involved in excavations at Steeton and East Lilling in Yorkshire in 1948 and 1949.

Beresford was appointed a Lecturer at the University of Leeds in 1948. He was promoted to Reader in 1955 and to Professor of Economic History in 1959, a post he was to hold until his retirement as Emeritus Professor in 1985.

Together with John Hurst he conducted archaeological excavations at the deserted village of Wharram Percy near Malton in North Yorkshire. This work became an important impetus for medieval archaeology in Britain and Europe.

Honours
Beresford was elected a Fellow of the British Academy (FBA) in 1985.

Death
Beresford died in Leeds on 15 December 2005 at the age of 85.

Bibliography

References

Sources

External links

1920 births
2005 deaths
English conscientious objectors
Economic historians
British medievalists
Fellows of the British Academy
People educated at Bishop Vesey's Grammar School
Alumni of Jesus College, Cambridge
Academics of the University of Leeds
20th-century English historians
People from Sutton Coldfield
British conscientious objectors
Medieval archaeologists